Isaac Keesing (1 August 1886 – 18 August 1966) was a Dutch journalist, writer, publisher and inventor.  Among his enterprises was Keesing's Contemporary Archives, published internationally between 1931 and 2016.

Biography
He was born in Amsterdam, the son of Tobie Keesing, a Jewish diamond broker, and Elisabeth  Zeehandelaar.  Isaac Keesing started work at the Amsterdamsche Bank, and also wrote articles on financial and economic matters for various newspapers, including the New York Times.  He devised a way of storing his information on a card index system, to obtain immediate access to it.  The archive of information became well-used, and in 1911 he set up a company, Systemen Keesing, to summarise and publish economic and financial information from a wide range of national and international sources, and to make it available to subscribers.  Its success led Keesing to seek to broaden its scope, and it expanded by establishing offices in Brussels, London and Paris.

In 1916 Keesing began publishing a magazine, Jong Nederland, aimed at students and young people; it continued until 1932.  He also invented a new way of sealing letters and documents, without using sealing wax, which was patented in the Netherlands in 1919 and in the U.S. in 1922.  In 1923, Keesing was approached by a friend, to take over and publish a periodical bulletin issued by the International Criminal Police Commission (ICPC, later known as Interpol), on information for exchange offices, banks and police dealing with forged money and cheques.  Keesing's periodical was known as Contrefaçons et Falsifications ("Counterfeits and Forgeries").  He also established a Dutch language series of puzzle books, Denksport, first published in 1930, which have continued up to the present, now as part of the Keesing Media Group.

Keesing began publishing both Keesing's Historical Archive and Keesing's Medical Archive as periodicals in 1931.  The Historical Archive, started in July 1931, was subtitled "Illustrated Diary of Contemporary World Events with Constantly Updated Alphabetical Index".  The aim was to provide objective information on political and economic changes around the world, with an index updated to maintain its value as a reference work.  It appeared as a 16-page weekly magazine, published in Dutch, English, German and French.  The company exhibited at the Brussels International Exposition in 1935, and by the following year had expanded to have over 80 employees.  Keesing's son,  (1912–1997), became a company director and in 1938 was responsible for establishing an English edition of the Medical Archive in the United States.

Following the German occupation of the Netherlands in 1940, Isaac Keesing's brother Jacob and his family tried to escape to England by boat, but the attempt failed and they committed suicide.  The imposition of German controls meant that Isaac and Leo Keesing, who were Jews, were dismissed from their company, but through the intervention of Broekhoff — at that time commissioner of the Amsterdam police — and an administrative error by the Germans, they were permitted to emigrate, eventually reaching the United States via Spain, Portugal, and Cuba, where they were interned for a time.   Keesing and his family lived during the latter part of the Second World War in Washington, D.C., where he worked at the Dutch embassy and filed another patent, for a card index system.

Keesing returned to the Netherlands after the war.  In his absence the company had been maintained by his accountant, but its output had been heavily biased towards German propaganda, and its premises had been looted.  The British branch of the company had been removed from the family's control.  Isaac and Leo Keesing re-established the company, and set up a subsidiary, ASSiMiL, producing language courses, many supported by gramophone records.

Isaac Keesing also wrote and published a popular series of children's books, starting in 1948 with Opa vertelt ("Grandpa tells").

He married Mariana Sophia Peekel in 1910; they had four children.  He died in Amsterdam in 1966 at the age of 80, and was buried at Muiderberg.

References

External links
  "Overcoming Obstacles to Freedom": Miriam Keesing recalls her family's wartime journey from the Netherlands, JDC Archives

1886 births
1966 deaths
Businesspeople from Amsterdam
20th-century Dutch businesspeople
Jewish Dutch writers